Tylopilus brachypus is a bolete fungus in the family Boletaceae found in Durango, Mexico, where it grows under pine and oak in montane forests. It was described as new to science in 1991.

See also
List of North American boletes

References

External links

brachypus
Fungi described in 1991
Fungi of Mexico
Fungi without expected TNC conservation status